Juan Jesus "Chuy" Hinojosa (born March 7, 1946) is a Democratic member of the Texas Senate representing the 20th District (Corpus Christi–McAllen).

Biographical information
Born in McAllen, Texas, Hinojosa was a farm worker who worked his way through school to earn a law degree. For more than 25 years, Hinojosa has represented South Texas in both the Texas House of Representatives and the Texas Senate.

Hinojosa served his country in the United States Marine Corps from 1966 to 1968, was a squad leader in Vietnam War. Returning to South Texas, he earned a bachelor's degree in Political Science from Pan American University in Edinburg, graduating with honors.

After receiving a law degree from Georgetown University in Washington D.C., Hinojosa worked for the Legal Aid Society of Nueces County in Corpus Christi and as an Assistant Attorney General in McAllen and San Antonio.

First elected to the Texas House of Representatives in 1981, Hinojosa served eight terms before being elected to the Texas Senate in 2002. Hinojosa has earned a reputation for his criminal justice expertise. He authored the Texas Fair Defense Act and other reforms to establish court-appointed counsel for indigent defendants, prohibit capital punishment for defendants with mental illness, and streamline the court system to provide swifter justice. He also sponsored SB 3, which established procedures for DNA testing, use and preservation. In 2005, Senator Hinojosa authored SB 1125 to eliminate the state's few remaining rogue drug task force operations and put them under the jurisdiction of the Department of Public Safety. In the wake of the Tulia drug-task-force scandal, Hinojosa worked to improve public policy by requiring that drug task force operations submit to state oversight, failure to do so would result in an inability to receive state-administered federal grant money. This change in public policy brought greater transparency and oversight to these operations.

During the 2007 legislative session, Hinojosa authored and passed SB 103; to completely reform the state's troubled Texas Youth Commission after sexual and physical abuse of youth were documented by the Texas Rangers. SB 103 made a number of fundamental changes, including ending the practice of housing children with older teenagers, and creating a Parent's Bill of Rights to guarantee swift and accurate access to information about caseworkers' duties and the agency's grievance policies. Senator Hinojosa was appointed to the TYC Legislative Oversight Committee to continue working on the reform of the troubled agency.

Hinojosa has twice been named one of Texas' top 10 legislators by Texas Monthly magazine, and in 2007 he again received accolades from the magazine for his work reforming the Texas Youth Commission. The National Organization for Women (NOW) named Hinojosa "Legislator of the Year," and he received the prestigious John Henry Faulk Award, presented by the American Civil Liberties Union. In 2006, he was the recipient of the Public Servant of the Year Award from the Coalition of Texans with Disabilities, and in 2007, he received the Patient Advocacy Award from the Texas Academy of Family Physicians. He also received the Humane Legislator award from the Humane Society of the United States, a special recognition award from the NAACP for his work on TYC and criminal justice reform and the "Texas Medicines Best Legislator" award from the Texas Medical Association for his work to restore Children's Health Insurance Program funding and improve childhood immunization rates.

He is not related to Texas U.S. Representative Rubén Hinojosa who represented the same general area in Congress as Senator Hinojosa does in the state Senate.

He is Vice Chairman of the Senate Finance Committee.

Election history

2004

2002

1992

Controversies

Incident at Miller International Airport in McAllen, Texas

In 2005, Hinojosa carried a gun past an airport security checkpoint. He was detained as police verified his concealed handgun permit and identity and traced the weapon before releasing him. Before Hinojosa was even arraigned, the criminal charges were dropped by local judge Kathleen Henley, prompting allegations of special treatment and corruption, including from Texas gun-owners, and from the McAllen police chief Victor Rodriguez who said: "I think dismayed is probably...too kind...for [how we feel about Judge Henley dismissing the charges] but it's in that area. Because we operated under the idea yesterday that an arraignment would take place" [but then] "we learned that Judge Henley basically dismissed him. ... I've never seen a case basically tossed out at the arraignment point," and "The laws are very specific and very clear. It's a chargeable offense even if it's done recklessly [i.e. accidentally, as was the excuse Senator Hinojosa gave]". Judge Henley has refused to comment on why she dismissed the charges against Hinojosa.

Hinojosa claims that he "was handled just like any other citizen", however, in comparison:
Many people have been penalized for "accidentally" carrying a gun through security check-points in American airports.

Hinojosa also made a public statement soon after the incident, admitting he had made a mistake by "rushing to the airport and not checking my briefcase prior to entering the McAllen Miller International Airport." He said airport security did its job. Soon after the incident, Hinojosa sent a letter of apology to the chief of the McAllen Police Department.  He also commended the department for performing its duty with utmost professionalism.

Traffic stop by South Texas Drug Task Force

In 2005, Hinojosa was pulled over by an agent from a South Texas Drug Task Force on Hwy 281 while traveling south.  The agent stated that the reason for the stop was that Hinojosa swerved his vehicle from lane to lane, and that the tint on Hinojosa's car was too dark. Hinojosa accused officers of racial profiling; the entire incident was videotaped and Hinojosa never proved the racial profiling accusation to the internal affairs division that supervises the officers who stopped him. Hinojosa told the agent during the stop that he had no reason to pull him over and that the tint on his windows was factory-issued. Hinojosa was allowed to continue his travel after being cited for the window tinting. Hinojosa later told Guillermo X. Garcia, a reporter for the San Antonio Express-News, that the task force agent followed him for 3 miles before pulling him over.

In 2005 legislative discussions, Hinojosa was quoted as saying, "These drug task forces are out there just interdicting and stopping people illegally without probable cause asking to search their vehicles and pretty much harassing citizens of the State of Texas.  And all they are trying to do is see if they can find money that they can seize to fund their operations. To me what they do is illegal, improper, and not good public policy."  Hinojosa also said of Texas' Drug Task Forces, "They don't need probable cause to stop you. They just stop you. They will profile you, which is illegal, ask to search your vehicle without probable cause, which is also illegal, and I refuse. But a lot of citizens don't know that and what they do is go through your car, snoop around, see what they can find and let you go if they don't find any money. Those drug task forces have no business operating in our state."

References

External links

 Profile at the Texas Senate
 Juan Hinojosa for Texas Senate
Project Vote Smart – Senator Juan Hinojosa (TX) profile
Follow the Money – Juan Hinojosa
2006 2004 2002 2000 1998 campaign contributions

|-

|-

|-

|-

1946 births
Living people
United States Marine Corps personnel of the Vietnam War
Georgetown University Law Center alumni
Democratic Party members of the Texas House of Representatives
Democratic Party Texas state senators
Hispanic and Latino American state legislators in Texas
Presidents pro tempore of the Texas Senate
People from McAllen, Texas
United States Marines
University of Texas–Pan American alumni
21st-century American politicians